General elections were held in the Gilbert and Ellice Islands in 1967. All candidates ran as independents.

Background
Earlier in the year the British government promulgated a new constitution for the islands, creating a House of Representatives to replace the Advisory Council. The new House of Representatives had 30 members, of which 23 were elected (19 from the Gilberts and four from Ellice Islands), five civil servants and two ex officio members.

In addition, the Executive Council was replaced with a Governing Council, to consist of five members of the House of Representatives (elected by the House) and two ex officio members.

Results
Only three of the ten members of the former Advisory Council that contested the elections were elected.

Official members

Aftermath
The new House of Representatives was opened by Resident Commissioner Val Andersen on 8 December 1967. Reuben Uatioa, who founded the Gilbertese National Party in 1965, was elected Chief Elected Member. A Governing Council was formed, consisting of four official members (M.D. Allen, D.G. Cudmore, E.P. Hamblett, C.P. North-Coombes) and five elected members (Uatioa, Edward Martin, Buren Ratieta, Iosia Taomia and Ioteba Tamuera Uriam).

A by-election was held for the Marakei seat in September 1968, which was won by Naboua Ratieta, the brother of the former incumbent Buren Ratieta.

References

Gilbert
Elections in the Gilbert and Ellice Islands
1967 in the Gilbert and Ellice Islands
Non-partisan elections